The Howe Ridge Fire was a wildfire in Glacier National Park in the U.S. state of Montana. Ignited by a thunderstorm on the evening of August 11, 2018, the fire was located on the northwest side of Lake McDonald. Several other fires were also started near the park due to the storm. On August 12 National Park Service officials issued a mandatory evacuation of private cabins and federally owned properties including the Lake McDonald Lodge complex which was temporarily closed. Though fire fighting conditions had improved by August 14, a preliminary damage assessment stated that at least seven private residences and several other structures belonging to the National Park Service had been consumed by the blaze at the Kelly's Camp Historic District and a number of other park service owned structures at the Wheeler residence. The Lake McDonald Ranger Station was saved by firefighters after its roof had been on fire. Thick haze and smoke obscured the fire on August 15 and while weather conditions remained favorable for fire growth, the haze kept the fire from spreading greatly. By August 21 overnight infrared imagery indicated the fire had burned . On August 23rd the fire had nearly 200 firefighters assigned to it and had burned  with only 10 percent of the fire contained. Full containment was not anticipated until November 1st. By August 28, cooler temperatures and widespread rain helped to keep the fire from expanding however a trend back to warmer and drier conditions was expected to provide conditions for future fire growth due to heavy fuels and terrain.

On August 31 the National Park Service reported that 13 residences and 14 more minor structures had been lost due to the fire and the costs associated with fighting the fire had reached 6.6 million dollars. By September 18, the fire was reduced to creeping and smoldering. A week earlier, officials reopened the western portions of the Going to the Sun Road but only for licensed shuttle services so they could transport tourists from Apgar Visitor center to Logan Pass. Officials stated the fire had cost over 12 million dollars since August 11 and 135 personnel were still assigned to the fire. On September 20 officials reopened the western portions of Going-to-the-Sun Road allowing private vehicles to travel the entire length of the scenic byway. By the end of September, the fire ceased to be spreading and most roads had reopened. The total cost of fighting the fire had exceeded 14 million dollars.

References 

2018 in Montana
Glacier National Park (U.S.)
2018 Montana wildfires